Alina Petrovna Ivanova (born 16 March 1969 in Kildishevo, Yadrinsky District, Chuvash ASSR) is a  retired Russian long-distance athlete who competing in race walking and road running. She is best known for winning the gold medal in the women's 10 km walk at the 1991 World Championships in Tokyo, Japan. She represented the Unified Team at the 1992 Summer Olympics in Barcelona, Spain.

She changed to the marathon run later in her career and was a two-time winner at both the Prague International Marathon and the Dublin Marathon.

International competitions

References

External links
 
 
 

1969 births
Living people
People from Yadrinsky District
Sportspeople from Chuvashia
Soviet female marathon runners
Soviet female long-distance runners
Soviet female racewalkers
Russian female marathon runners
Russian female long-distance runners
Russian female racewalkers
Olympic athletes of the Unified Team
Athletes (track and field) at the 1992 Summer Olympics
World Athletics Championships athletes for Russia
World Athletics Championships athletes for the Soviet Union
World Athletics Championships medalists
CIS Athletics Championships winners
Soviet Athletics Championships winners
World Athletics Championships winners